Sathon or Sathorn is one of the 50 districts (khet) of Bangkok, Thailand. The district is bounded by six other districts (from north clockwise): Bang Rak, Pathum Wan, Khlong Toei, Yan Nawa, Bang Kho Laem, and Khlong San (across the Chao Phraya River).

History
Sathon district was once part of Yan Nawa. Due to its large area and population, first a branch district office of Yan Nawa was set up on 9 March 1989 to serve the people in three khwaeng of Yan Nawa.  And then on 9 November 1989, the Sathon district was established inheriting the area once served by the branch office.

The district is named after Sathon Road and Khlong Sathon. Khlong Sathon, the older of the two, is a canal (khlong) dug for public transportation by a Chinese company. The Chinese owner was later granted the name Luang Sathon Racha Yut (หลวงสาทรราชายุตก์) by King Chulalongkorn for his accomplishment. Both sides of the canal later became Sathon Road. Incorrect Thai spelling for Sathon สาธร had been used for very long time, but it was corrected in April 1999. His former house is now Sathon Mansion in Bang Rak District.

Administration
The district is divided into three sub-districts (khwaeng).

The Department of Airports of Thailand is headquartered in Sathon, as was its predecessor, the Department of Civil Aviation.

Aeronautical Radio of Thailand (AEROTHAI) and Bangkok Dock Company, the state enterprises under the Ministry of Transport also based in the district.

Sathon Road

Sathon Road marks the northern boundary of the district, with the southern lane of the road belonging to Sathon District and the northern lane across the Sathon Canal belonging to Bang Rak.

Along Sathon Road there are many up-scale hotels, the famous "Robot Building", Saint Louis Hospital (and church, and school), the Apostolic Nunciature of The Holy See, and the Blue Elephant cooking school.

Places

Wat Yannawa (วัดยานนาวา), a temple dating back to the Ayutthaya period, is probably the best known temple in Sathon. It has a unique junk-shaped chedi and viharn built by King Rama III. The idea behind the construction was that Chinese junk was quickly disappearing and the pagoda should show present descendants what it looked like. The temple was known as Wat Kok Khwai (วัดคอกควาย) during the Ayutthaya Kingdom and Wat Kok Krabue (วัดคอกกระบือ) during the Thonburi and early-Bangkok eras before the construction of the chedi.

Wat Don (วัดดอน) was built in 1797 during the King Rama I period by people who immigrated from Tavoy, Myanmar. The name Wat Don is equally well known for the Wat Don Cemetery not far away. The graveyard contains the remains of people of Chinese heritage. In the past, it was rumored to be a haunted place. Next to the cemetery is Wat Prok (วัดปรก), a Mon-styled Buddhist temple.

Hindu Dharma Sabha Association (สมาคมฮินดูธรรมสภา), also better known as Wat Vishnu (วัดวิษณุ) is one of Bangkok's oldest and most prominent Hindu temples apart from Sri Mahamariamman Temple in Bang Rak and Devasathan in Phra Nakhon. It is a temple in Vaishnavism established in 1920, considered as the only temple that enshrined the idol of all the major Hindu gods. Located in the same alley of Wat Prok.

Saint Louis Church, or locally known as Wat Saint Louis (วัดเซนต์หลุยส์) is the only Catholic church on the side of Sathon Road. It was named in honour of Saint Louis.

San Chao Mae Brahma Met (ศาลเจ้าแม่พรหมเมศ) is a Chinese joss house of Teochew on Charoen Krung Road near Sathon Bridge and Wat Yannawa, originally it was located at the mouth of Khlong Sathon. But later, when Sathon Bridge was built, it moved into the present location. Next to the shrine is Soi Wanglee (ซอยหวั่งหลี), a traditional community in the part of commercial district from Chinese junk to the steamboat periods. This area was originally filled with docks, various rice mills and also the location of the Chinese port to transport goods and passengers to Singapore, Hong Kong, Shantou, Hainan etc. All of which are joint ventures of Chinese-Thai businessmen during King Chulalongkorn's reign, but later they had conflicts. In the end, they were sold to the Wanglee family. Currently, this community no longer exists, it turned out to be just a wasteland beside Wat Yannawa.

Economy
Nok Air has its head office in the Rajanakarn Building in Yan Nawa, Sathon.

Education

 Assumption College Primary Section
Garden International School Bangkok 
Rajamangala University of Technology Krungthep
Wat Suthiwararam School
Satri Si Suriyothai School
Saint Louis College (Bangkok)

Diplomatic missions
 Embassy of Austria
 Embassy of Brazil
 Embassy of Denmark
 Embassy of Germany
 Apostolic Nunciature of the Holy See
 Embassy of Luxembourg
 Embassy of Malaysia
 Embassy of Mexico
 Embassy of Morocco
 Embassy of Panama
 Embassy of Singapore
 Embassy of Slovakia
 Embassy of United Kingdom

References

External links

 BMA website with tourist landmarks of Sathon
 Sathon district office

 
Districts of Bangkok